Ovlov is an American rock band from Newtown, Connecticut.

Career
Ovlov began in 2009 with the release of an EP titled Crazy Motorcycle Jump. They followed that up with another EP in 2011 titled What's So Great About The City. In 2013, Ovlov released their first full-length album on Exploding in Sound titled Am. In August 2014, Ovlov released a split with Little Big League. Two months later, the band released a split with Krill, LVL UP, and Radiator Hospital. In 2018, Ovlov released their second full-length album on Exploding in Sound titled Tru. Ovlov released their third full-length album, Buds, in 2021.

Discography
Studio albums
Am (2013)
Tru (2018)
Buds (2021)

EPs
Crazy Motorcycle Jump (2009)
What's So Great About The city (2011)

Splits
Ovlov/Little Big League (2014)
Ovlov/Radiator Hospital/Krill/LVL UP (2014)

References

Newtown, Connecticut
Rock music groups from Connecticut
Year of establishment missing